Baptist Church, also known as Stone Church, is a historic church building in Sperry, Iowa, United States. The Baptist congregation that built this church was founded in 1840. They built this building seven years later. In addition to religious services, it was the meeting place for a variety of community events. The church building is surrounded by a cemetery, which contains the graves of some of the areas first settlers. The utilitarian design of the church building and the use of local materials is characteristic of pioneer church architecture in Iowa. The  building is a single-story, gable roof structure. It features a cornice return. The roughly cut stone exterior uses larger stones at the corners for a decorative effect. The interior walls are plaster and the flooring are pine boards. It still houses the original hardwood pews, pulpit, minister's settee, and hand-carved altar. The building was damaged in a tornado in 1964, and the repairs conform to the original character of the church. It was added to the National Register in 1977.

References

Religious organizations established in 1840
Churches completed in 1847
Baptist churches in Iowa
Churches in Des Moines County, Iowa
Churches on the National Register of Historic Places in Iowa
National Register of Historic Places in Des Moines County, Iowa
1840 establishments in Iowa Territory